Arandu is a Brazilian municipality of the state of São Paulo. The population is 6,365 (2020 est.) in an area of 286 km². The city is served by Avaré-Arandu Airport located at the adjoining municipality of Avaré.

References

Municipalities in São Paulo (state)